Sultan Sulaiman ibn ‘Ali ibn ‘Ajlan was the fourth Sultan of Brunei according to Silsilah Raja-Raja Berunai. He succeeded his father in 1432  and ruled until his abdication in 1485, to allow his son Bolkiah to become Sultan. During his reign, he continued the legacies of his father in strengthening the spread of Islam and the construction of Kota Batu. He was also known as Raja Tua. According to oral tradition, the sultan was said to live more than 100 years old. In the Boxer Codex, he was known as Soliman by the Spaniards.

Death
Sultan Sulaiman died in 1501. His tombstone is located in Jalan Subok, Brunei. The inscription of Sultan Sulaiman's tombstone mentions the name of the sultan and the date of his death.

See also 
 Greater Sunda Islands
 List of Sultans of Brunei

References 

1501 deaths
15th-century Sultans of Brunei
Bruneian people of Saudi Arabian descent
Year of birth unknown